Morass (German:Morast) is a 1922 German silent film directed by Wolfgang Neff and starring Maria Zelenka.

The film's sets were designed by the art director Mathieu Oostermann.

Cast
 Maria Zelenka as Lissy  
 Henri Peters-Arnolds 
 Karl Elzer 
 Bella Polini as Frau Tertiol  
 Colette Corder as Meta  
 Willy Kaiser-Heyl 
 Julius Frucht as Dr. Herrmann

External links

1922 films
Films of the Weimar Republic
Films directed by Wolfgang Neff
German silent feature films
German black-and-white films